Kathryn Joosten (born Kathryn Rausch; December 20, 1939 – June 2, 2012) was an American actress. Her best known roles include Dolores Landingham on NBC's The West Wing from 1999 to 2002 and Karen McCluskey on ABC's Desperate Housewives from 2005 to 2012, for which she won two Primetime Emmy Awards in 2005 and 2008.

Early life
Joosten was born Kathryn Rausch in Chicago, Illinois to Dutch-German parents. Her first career was as a psychiatric nurse at Michael Reese Hospital in Chicago, living in nearby Lake Forest, Illinois, where she married a psychiatrist and raised two sons. Following her 1980 divorce, she began acting in community theater in 1982, at age 42.

Career
In 1992, aged 53, she was hired as a street performer working for the Disney-MGM Studios theme park at Walt Disney World in Orlando, Florida. In 1995, she moved to Hollywood, where she took guest roles in  television series such as Roseanne, Home Improvement, Picket Fences, Murphy Brown, ER, Seinfeld, Frasier, Just Shoot Me!, Buffy the Vampire Slayer, Dharma & Greg, Las Vegas and The Drew Carey Show. In a 1997 episode of Frasier, "Roz's Turn", Joosten appeared as Vera, the mother and personal secretary of Frasier's conniving agent, Bebe Glazer, played by Harriet Sansom Harris. The pair would later be reunited to play opposite neighbors in Desperate Housewives.

In 1999, Joosten took the role of Mrs. Landingham, personal secretary to President Josiah Bartlet (played by Martin Sheen) in The West Wing. Joosten played the role for two seasons, until her character's death in a car crash in 2001, and returned to the show twice more in flashback appearances. Her role on The West Wing gave her an entrance into more significant guest roles on notable television series.

After 2001, she appeared in such shows as Scrubs (appearing in "My Old Lady", which won a Humanitas Prize as well as reappearing in two later episodes), My Name is Earl, Spin City, The X-Files, Judging Amy, Monk, Charmed, Will & Grace, Malcolm in the Middle, Grey's Anatomy, The Suite Life of Zack & Cody, Reba, So Little Time, Gilmore Girls, The Closer and a recurring role as one of the less intimidating incarnations of God seen by the title character (played by Amber Tamblyn) on the TV series Joan of Arcadia.  In 2005, Joosten appeared in the film Wedding Crashers, starring Vince Vaughn and Owen Wilson.

Joosten had a recurring role on Desperate Housewives as Karen McCluskey. For this role, Joosten won two Emmy Awards for Outstanding Guest Actress in a Comedy Series in 2005 and 2008 and once again was nominated for 2010, and appeared as a presenter at the 2005 and 2008 Emmy Awards telecasts. She received Screen Actors Guild Award nominations with the rest of the cast for Outstanding Performance by an Ensemble in a Comedy Series from 2006–2008. She was promoted to a member of the regular cast in Season 6. However, the Emmys still billed her as a "Guest Actress" when she was nominated for a third time for Outstanding Guest Actress in a Comedy Series for the 2010 Emmys. She was then nominated for a fourth Emmy, this time for Primetime Emmy Award for Outstanding Supporting Actress in a Comedy Series in 2012. She played Aunt Jackie in Alvin and the Chipmunks: The Squeakquel in 2009.

In 2009, Joosten and Lily Tomlin were in talks to star in a Desperate Housewives spin-off. The spin-off was given a preliminary green light to proceed. However, the series did not proceed.

Health
Joosten appeared in numerous television commercials such as those for V8 and Fiber One. In 2007, in an appearance on The View, she revealed that she was in remission from lung cancer, after many years of chain smoking (which she had by then quit). She offered some tips on how to beat the habit of smoking. Coincidentally, her guest roles on My Name Is Earl and Grey's Anatomy revolved largely around her character attempting to quit smoking. In 2001, she quit her 45-year smoking habit when she was diagnosed with lung cancer. In September 2009, Joosten was diagnosed with lung cancer for a second time. She subsequently underwent surgery and four rounds of chemotherapy, and was found to be cancer-free in January 2010.

Joosten made a guest appearance on The Bold and the Beautiful on February 7, 2011, as part of the show's 6,000th episode, which featured several other real-life lung cancer survivors discussing their experiences with two of the show's characters, played by Susan Flannery and Jack Wagner, who were dealing with lung cancer.

Joosten was named the national spokesperson for the Lung Cancer Profiles campaign on behalf of Pfizer.

Death
Joosten died of lung cancer on June 2, 2012. Her death occurred "just weeks after" the onscreen death from cancer of her Desperate Housewives character, Karen McCluskey.

Filmography & Television

References

External links
 
 
 Emmy's: Emmy Winner Kathryn Joosten Succumbs to Lung Cancer

1939 births
2012 deaths
20th-century American actresses
21st-century American actresses
Actresses from Chicago
Actresses from Florida
American film actresses
American nurses
American women nurses
American people of Dutch descent
American people of German descent
American television actresses
Deaths from lung cancer in California
People from Eustis, Florida
Primetime Emmy Award winners